Woodia is a genus in the family Apocynaceae first described as a genus in 1894. It is native to southern Africa

Species
 Woodia mucronata N.E.Br.
 Woodia singularis N.E. Br.
 Woodia verruculosa Schltr.

References

External links

Apocynaceae genera
Flora of Southern Africa
Asclepiadoideae